Phi Sigma Rho, also known as Phi Rho or PSR, is a social sorority for individuals who identify as female or non-binary in science, technology, engineering, and mathematics. The sorority was founded in 1984 at Purdue University. It has since expanded to more than 40 colleges across the United States.

History
Phi Sigma Rho was founded on September 24, 1984, at Purdue University by Rashmi Khanna and Abby McDonald. Khanna and McDonald were unable to participate in traditional sorority rush due to the demands of the sororities and their engineering program, so they decided to start a new sorority that would take their academic program's demands into consideration. 

The Alpha chapter at Purdue University was founded with ten charter members: Gail Bonney, Anita Chatterjea, Ann Cullinan, Pam Kabbes, Rashmi Khanna, Abby McDonald, Christine Mooney, Tina Kershner, Michelle Self, and Kathy Vargo.

Phi Sigma Rho accepts students pursuing degrees in science, technology, engineering, and mathematics who identify as female or who identify as non-binary. The sorority made the decision to include non-binary students in all chapters in the summer of 2021.

Phi Sigma Rho has grown more than 40 chapters nationally. Its headquarters is located in Northville, Michigan. Its online magazine is The Key.

Symbols
The colors of Phi Sigma Rho are wine red and silver. The sorority's flower is the orchid, and its jewel is the pearl. Its mascot is Sigmand the penguin. Its motto is "together we build the future."

Objectives
The objectives of Phi Sigma Rho are:

  To foster and provide the broadening experience of sorority living with its social and moral challenges and responsibilities for the individual and the chapter.
  To develop the highest standard of personal integrity and character.
  To promote academic excellence and support personal achievement, while providing a social balance.
  To aid the individual in the transition from academic to the professional community.
  To maintain sorority involvement with the alma mater and the community through responsible participation.
  To maintain the bond of sisterhood with alumnae members through communication, consultation, and participation in Sorority functions.

Philanthropy 
Phi Sigma Rho's national philanthropy is the Leukemia & Lymphoma Society. 

The Phi Sigma Rho Foundation was established as a separate nonprofit organization in 2005. It supports the educational and philanthropic efforts of the sorority's members and offers merit-based scholarships to sorority members.

Chapters 
The following tables lists Phi Sigma Rho chapters, prospective chapters, and interest groups. Active chapters are indicated in bold. Inactive chapters are indicated in italic.

Notes

See also 
 Professional fraternities and sororities
 Society of Women Engineers

References 

Fraternities and sororities in the United States
Student societies in the United States
Student organizations established in 1984
1984 establishments in Indiana
Purdue University
Engineering societies